Georgia participated in the Junior Eurovision Song Contest 2013 which took place on 30 November 2013, in Kyiv, Ukraine. Georgian Public Broadcaster (GPB) was responsible for organising their entry for the contest. The Smile Shop was internally selected to represent Georgia with the song "Give Me Your Smile". Georgia placed 5th with 91 points.

Background

Before Junior Eurovision
The Georgian broadcaster announced on 10 June 2013, that they would be participating at the contest to be held in Kyiv, Ukraine. Their artist and song were selected through an internal selection. On 8 October 2013, The Smile Shop was selected to represent Georgia with their song for the contest, "Give Me Your Smile".

Artist and song information

The Smile Shop
The Smile Shop are a Georgian band who represented Georgia in the Junior Eurovision Song Contest 2013 with their song "Give Me Your Smile" which came fifth with a total of 91 points. They consist of Mariam Shavladze, Ana Kvantaliani, Saba Chachua, Mariam Samushia, Luka Gogiberidze and Tamta Diasamidze.

Give Me Your Smile
"Give Me Your Smile" is a song by Georgian band The Smile Shop. It represented Georgia during the Junior Eurovision Song Contest 2013. It is composed and written by Giga Kukhianidze with help from the Smile Shop themselves.

At Junior Eurovision
During the opening ceremony and the running order draw which took place on 25 November 2013, Georgia received a 'wildcard', enabling them to choose their running order position. They chose to run 9th on 30 November 2015, following Moldova and preceding the Netherlands.

Final
The Smile Shop performed in three pairs in old-fashioned attire amidst a backdrop of colourful floating smiling faces.

Voting

Notes

References

External links 
  GPB website

Georgia
Junior Eurovision Song Contest
2013